Biggersville is a census-designated place and unincorporated community in Alcorn County, Mississippi, United States.  It lies along U.S. Route 45 six miles south of Corinth in the northeastern part of the state.  Biggersville is home to Biggersville High School and several small businesses. It was first named as a CDP in the 2020 Census which listed a population of 205.

Demographics

2020 census

Note: the US Census treats Hispanic/Latino as an ethnic category. This table excludes Latinos from the racial categories and assigns them to a separate category. Hispanics/Latinos can be of any race.

References

Unincorporated communities in Alcorn County, Mississippi
Unincorporated communities in Mississippi
Census-designated places in Mississippi
Census-designated places in Alcorn County, Mississippi